Devonshire Park Ground is a cricket ground in Weston-super-Mare, Somerset.  It hosted two List A cricket matches for Somerset County Cricket Club; one in 1969, and the other the following year.  It has also been the venue for a number of matches for Somerset's second XI, hosting a Minor Counties Championship match in 1972, and eight other second XI matches between 1986 and 1991.  It is the home ground for Weston-super-Mare Cricket Club, who have played on the ground since at least 1928.

References

External links
 Ground Profile: Devonshire Park Ground, Weston-super-Mare from CricketArchive
 Ground Proile: Devonshire Road Park Ground from Cricinfo

Cricket grounds in Somerset
Sport in Weston-super-Mare